CBNA may refer to:

 CBNA-FM, a radio station (100.3 FM) licensed to St. Anthony, Newfoundland and Labrador, Canada
 Citibank, National Association, a bank headquartered in New York City, United States, backing a lot of store credit cards
 Coe-Brown Northwood Academy, a high school in Northwood, New Hampshire, United States
 Community Bank, N.A., a bank servicing Upstate New York and Northeastern Pennsylvania
 Citibank, N.A., a multinational bank
 Cannabinolic acid, a cannabinoid